
Gmina Krzeszowice is an urban-rural gmina (administrative district) in Kraków County, Lesser Poland Voivodeship, in southern Poland.

The gmina contains part of the protected area called Kraków Valleys Landscape Park.

Villages
Apart from the town of Krzeszowice, Gmina Krzeszowice contains the villages and settlements of Czerna, Dębnik, Dubie, Filipowice, Frywałd, Miękinia, Nawojowa Góra, Nowa Góra, Nowa Góra-Łany, Ostrężnica, Paczółtowice, Rudno, Sanka, Siedlec, Tenczynek, Wola Filipowska, Zalas and Żary.

Neighbouring gminas
Gmina Krzeszowice is bordered by the gminas of Alwernia, Czernichów, Jerzmanowice-Przeginia, Liszki, Olkusz, Trzebinia and Zabierzów.

References
Polish official population figures 2006

Krzeszowice
Kraków County